Ines Fujin (Japanese : アイネスフウジン, 10 April 1987 - 5 April 2004) was a Japanese Thoroughbred racehorse and sire. He participated in 8 races between 1989 and 1990, participating in G1 races as a two-year-old colt, and climbing from G1 races as a three-year-old colt, placing first in 4 of them.

He became a breeding stallion in 1992, spawning multiple successors.

Ines Fujin died on April 5, 2004.

Appearance 
Ines Fujin was a dark brown horse with a small white irregular star on his forehead. He often raced in a light colored blinker hood.

Background 
Ines Fujin was bred in Japan by breeder Kozo Nakamura, and sired by Sea Hawk, who was a thoroughbred racehorse that raced in G2 and G3 races. He was owned by Masaaki Kobayashi, trained by Shuho Kato, and jockeyed by Eiji Nakano.

Ines Fujin won the JRA Awards for Best Two-Year-Old Colt in 1989 and Best Three-Year-Old Colt in 1990.

Racing career

1989: two-year-old season 
Ines Fujin participated in four races as two-year-old colt. The first two were 1600 meter newcomer races, where he placed second in both. The third was a maiden race, also 1600 meters, where he placed first of 8. The fourth and final race of his two-year-old season was the Asahi Hai Futurity Stakes 1600 meter event, where he placed first of 15.

1990: three-year-old season 
Ines Fujin began his three-year-old colt series in the 1800 meter Kyodo Tsushin Hai G3 event, where he placed first of 8 horses. He was promoted to Grade II and participated in the Yayoi Sho 2000 meter event, placing fourth of 14. This race promoted him to Grade I, where he participated in the G1 Satsuki Sho and Japan Derby, coming first and second of 18 and 22 respectively. In this Japan Derby, 196,517 people visited in the Tokyo Racecourse. This number of visitors is recognized as a world record, but this record has not yet been updated.Ines Fujin retired as a sire after this.

Pedigree

References 

Racehorses bred in Japan
Racehorses trained in Japan
1987 racehorse births
2004 racehorse deaths